An indoor roller coaster or enclosed roller coaster is a roller coaster built inside a structure. The structure may be unrelated to the ride, or it may be intended solely or primarily for the ride. Many indoor coasters are custom made and placed in amusement parks or shopping malls. LaMarcus Adna Thompson, who pioneered the construction of the first simple roller coasters, initially built "scenic railway" rides including "indoor tableaux, panoramas, and biblical scenes illumined by car-tripped switches and flood lamps". A "completely enclosed roller coaster" called the Twister was built as early as 1925. Walt Disney World's Space Mountain was one of the first rides considered to be an indoor roller coaster, and was "the first indoor roller coaster where riders were in total darkness for the length of the ride so they couldn't tell where the drops or turns would occur".

List of indoor roller coasters

Inside structures purpose-built for the ride

Asia 
 Alien Taxi at Trans Studio Cibubur
 Comet Express at Lotte World
 Kereta Misteri at Dunia Fantasi
 Panic Coaster – Back Daaan at Tokyo Dome City Attractions
 Revenge of the Mummy at Universal Studios Singapore
 Star Wars Hyperspace Mountain at Hong Kong Disneyland

Europe 
 Bird Rok at Efteling
 Cagliostro at Rainbow MagicLand
 Crazy Bats at Phantasialand
 Crush's Coaster at Walt Disney Studios Park
 Eurosat - CanCan Coaster at Europa-Park
 Huracan at Bellewaerde 
 Revolution / Mount Mara at Bobbejaanland
 Movie Park Studios at Movie Park Germany
 Rock 'n' Roller Coaster avec Aerosmith (closed) at Walt Disney Studios Park
 Psyké Underground at Walibi Belgium
 Star Wars Hyperspace Mountain at Disneyland Park (Paris) also named Space Mountain de la Terre à la Lune (1995-2005) and Space Mountain Mission 2 (2005-2017)
 Van Helsing's Factory at Movie Park Germany
 The Walking Dead: The Ride at Thorpe Park
 Winja's Fear & Force at Phantasialand

Australia 
 Scooby-Doo Spooky Coaster at Warner Bros. Movie World

North America 
 The Dark Knight Coaster at Six Flags Great Adventure, Six Flags Great America and Six Flags México

United States
 Blazing Fury at Dollywood
 Black Diamond at Knoebels Amusement Resort
 Disaster Transport at Cedar Point, removed to make way for GateKeeper
 The Exterminator at Kennywood
 Fire in the Hole at Silver Dollar City
 Flight of Fear at Kings Dominion and Kings Island
 Guardians of the Galaxy: Cosmic Rewind at Epcot
 Harry Potter and the Escape from Gringotts at Universal Studios Florida
 Mystery Mine at Dollywood
 Revenge of the Mummy: The Ride at Universal Studios Florida and Universal Studios Hollywood
 Rock 'n' Roller Coaster Starring Aerosmith at Disney's Hollywood Studios
 Runaway Mountain at Six Flags Over Texas
 Skull Mountain at Six Flags Great Adventure
 Space Mountain at Magic Kingdom and Disneyland Park
 Laff Trakk at Hersheypark

Inside structures unrelated to the ride

Asia
 Jungle Storm at Chakazoolu Indoor Theme Park
 Sky Train within the Dragon Centre
 Supersonic Odyssey at Cosmo's World
 Tron Lightcycle Power Run at Shanghai Disneyland Park
 At the Wonderful World of Whimsy in Cityplaza 2

Europe
 Boomerang at Attractiepark Toverland
 Linnunrata at Linnanmäki
 Piratenbaan at Plopsa Indoor Coevorden
 Piratenbaan at Plopsa Indoor Hasselt
 Winjas at Phantasialand

North America

Canada 
 Autosled at Galaxyland
 Crystal Bullet at Crystal Palace (closed in 2014)
 Dragon Wagon at Galaxyland
 Galaxy Orbiter at Galaxyland
 Mindbender at Galaxyland

United States 
 Avatar Airbender at Nickelodeon Universe (Mall of America)
 Back at the Barnyard Hayride at Nickelodeon Universe (Mall of America)
 Canyon Blaster at Adventuredome
 Fairly Odd Coaster at Nickelodeon Universe (Mall of America)
 Nickelodeon Slime Streak at Nickelodeon Universe (American Dream Meadowlands)
 Pepsi Orange Streak at Nickelodeon Universe (Mall of America)
 Roller Coaster at Neverland
 The Shredder at  Nickelodeon Universe (American Dream Meadowlands)
 SpongeBob SquarePants Rock Bottom Plunge at Nickelodeon Universe (Mall of America)
 TMNT Shellraiser at Nickelodeon Universe (American Dream Meadowlands)

References